Jekob Abiezer Jeno (born 22 June 2000) is a New Caledonian professional footballer who plays as a midfielder for Grenoble and the New Caledonia national team.

References

External links

2000 births
Living people
New Caledonian footballers
Association football midfielders
New Caledonia international footballers
Ligue 2 players
Championnat National 3 players
Amiens SC players
AC Amiens players
Grenoble Foot 38 players